Copelatus wewalkai is a species of diving beetle. It is part of the subfamily Copelatinae in the family Dytiscidae. It was described by Holmen & Vazirani in 1990.

References 

wewalkai
Beetles described in 1990